Pixar Animation Studios is an American computer animation studio  known for its critically and commercially successful computer animated feature films. It is based in Emeryville, California. Since 2006, Pixar has been a subsidiary of Walt Disney Studios, a division of Disney Entertainment, which is owned by The Walt Disney Company.

Pixar started in 1979 as part of the Lucasfilm computer division. It was known as the Graphics Group before its spin-off as a corporation in 1986, with funding from Apple co-founder Steve Jobs who became its majority shareholder. Disney purchased Pixar in January 2006 at a valuation of $7.4+ billion by converting each share of Pixar stock to 2.3 shares of Disney stock. Pixar is best known for its feature films, technologically powered by RenderMan, the company's own implementation of the industry-standard RenderMan Interface Specification image-rendering API. The studio's mascot is Luxo Jr., a desk lamp from the studio's 1986 short film of the same name.

Pixar has produced 26 feature films, starting with Toy Story (1995), which is the first fully computer-animated feature film; its most recent film was Lightyear (2022). The studio has also produced many short films. , its feature films have earned approximately $14 billion at the worldwide box office, with an average worldwide gross of $680 million per film. Toy Story 3 (2010), Finding Dory (2016), Incredibles 2 (2018), and Toy Story 4 (2019) are all among the 50 highest-grossing films of all time. Incredibles 2 being the fourth-highest-grossing animated film of all time, with a gross of $1.2 billion; the other three also grossed over $1 billion. Moreover, 15 of Pixar's films are in the 50 highest-grossing animated films of all time.

Pixar has earned 23 Academy Awards, 10 Golden Globe Awards, and 11 Grammy Awards, along with numerous other awards and acknowledgments. Its films are frequently nominated for the Academy Award for Best Animated Feature, since its inauguration in 2001, with eleven winners being Finding Nemo (2003), The Incredibles (2004), Ratatouille (2007), WALL-E (2008), Up (2009), Toy Story 3 (2010), Brave (2012), Inside Out (2015), Coco (2017), Toy Story 4 (2019), and Soul (2020); the five nominated without winning are Monsters, Inc. (2001), Cars (2006), Incredibles 2 (2018), Onward (2020), and Luca (2021). Up and Toy Story 3 were also nominated for the more competitive and inclusive Academy Award for Best Picture.

On February 10, 2009, Pixar executives John Lasseter, Brad Bird, Pete Docter, Andrew Stanton, and Lee Unkrich were presented with the Golden Lion award for Lifetime Achievement by the Venice Film Festival. The physical award was ceremoniously handed to Lucasfilm's founder, George Lucas.

History

Early history

Pixar got its start in 1974, when New York Institute of Technology's (NYIT) founder, Alexander Schure, who was also the owner of a traditional animation studio, established the Computer Graphics Lab (CGL) and recruited computer scientists who shared his ambitions about creating the world's first computer-animated film. Edwin Catmull and Malcolm Blanchard were the first to be hired and were soon joined by Alvy Ray Smith and David DiFrancesco some months later, which were the four original members of the Computer Graphics Lab, located in a converted two-story garage acquired from the former Vanderbilt-Whitney estate. Schure kept pouring money into the computer graphics lab, an estimated $15 million, giving the group everything they desired and driving NYIT into serious financial troubles. Eventually, the group realized they needed to work in a real film studio in order to reach their goal. Francis Ford Coppola then invited Smith to his house for a three-day media conference, where Coppola and George Lucas shared their visions for the future of digital moviemaking.

When Lucas approached them and offered them a job at his studio, six employees moved to Lucasfilm. During the following months, they gradually resigned from CGL, found temporary jobs for about a year to avoid making Schure suspicious, and joined the Graphics Group at Lucasfilm.
The Graphics Group, which was one-third of the Computer Division of Lucasfilm, was launched in 1979 with the hiring of Catmull from NYIT, where he was in charge of the Computer Graphics Lab. He was then reunited with Smith, who also made the journey from NYIT to Lucasfilm, and was made the director of the Graphics Group. At NYIT, the researchers pioneered many of the CG foundation techniques—in particular, the invention of the alpha channel by Catmull and Smith. Over the next several years, the CGL would produce a few frames of an experimental film called The Works. After moving to Lucasfilm, the team worked on creating the precursor to RenderMan, called REYES (for "renders everything you ever saw") and developed several critical technologies for CG—including particle effects and various animation tools.

John Lasseter was hired to the Lucasfilm team for a week in late 1983 with the title "interface designer"; he animated the short film The Adventures of André & Wally B. In the next few years, a designer suggested naming a new digital compositing computer the "Picture Maker". Smith suggested that the laser-based device have a catchier name, and came up with "Pixer", which after a meeting was changed to "Pixar".

In 1982, the Pixar team began working on special-effects film sequences with Industrial Light & Magic. After years of research, and key milestones such as the Genesis Effect in Star Trek II: The Wrath of Khan and the Stained Glass Knight in Young Sherlock Holmes, the group, which then numbered 40 individuals, was spun out as a corporation in February 1986 by Catmull and Smith. Among the 38 remaining employees, there were also Malcolm Blanchard, David DiFrancesco, Ralph Guggenheim, and Bill Reeves, who had been part of the team since the days of NYIT. Tom Duff, also an NYIT member, would later join Pixar after its formation. With Lucas's 1983 divorce, which coincided with the sudden dropoff in revenues from Star Wars licenses following the release of Return of the Jedi, they knew he would most likely sell the whole Graphics Group. Worried that the employees would be lost to them if that happened, which would prevent the creation of the first computer-animated movie, they concluded that the best way to keep the team together was to turn the group into an independent company. But Moore's Law also suggested that sufficient computing power for the first film was still some years away, and they needed to focus on a proper product until then. Eventually, they decided they should be a hardware company in the meantime, with their Pixar Image Computer as the core product, a system primarily sold to governmental, scientific, and medical markets. They also used SGI computers.

In 1983, Nolan Bushnell founded a new computer-guided animation studio called Kadabrascope as a subsidiary of his Chuck E. Cheese's Pizza Time Theatres company (PTT), which was founded in 1977. Only one major project was made out of the new studio, an animated Christmas special for NBC starring Chuck E. Cheese and other PTT mascots; known as "Chuck E. Cheese: The Christmas That Almost Wasn't". The animation movement would be made using tweening instead of traditional cel animation. After the video game crash of 1983, Bushnell started selling some subsidiaries of PTT to keep the business afloat. Sente Technologies (another division, was founded to have games distributed in PTT stores) was sold to Bally Games and Kadabrascope was sold to Lucasfilm. The Kadabrascope assets were combined with the Computer Division of Lucasfilm. Coincidentally, one of Steve Jobs's first jobs was under Bushnell in 1973 as a technician at his other company Atari, which Bushnell sold to Warner Communications in 1976 to focus on PTT. PTT would later go bankrupt in 1984 and be acquired by ShowBiz Pizza Place.

Independent company (1986–1999) 

In 1986, the newly independent Pixar was headed by President Edwin Catmull and Executive Vice President Alvy Ray Smith. Lucas's search for investors led to an offer from Steve Jobs, which Lucas initially found too low. He eventually accepted after determining it impossible to find other investors. At that point, Smith and Catmull had been declined 45 times, and 35 venture capitalists and ten large corporations had declined. Jobs, who had been edged out of Apple in 1985, was now founder and CEO of the new computer company NeXT. On February 3, 1986, he paid $5 million of his own money to George Lucas for technology rights and invested $5 million cash as capital into the company, joining the board of directors as chairman.

In 1985 while still at Lucasfilm, they had made a deal with the Japanese publisher Shogakukan to make a computer-animated movie called Monkey, based on the Monkey King. The project continued sometime after they became a separate company in 1986, but it became clear that the technology was not sufficiently advanced. The computers were not powerful enough and the budget would be too high. As a result they focused on the computer hardware business for years until a computer-animated feature became feasible according to Moore's law.

At the time, Walt Disney Studios was interested and eventually bought and used the Pixar Image Computer and custom software written by Pixar as part of its Computer Animation Production System (CAPS) project, to migrate the laborious ink and paint part of the 2D animation process to a more automated method. The company's first feature film to be released using this new animation method was The Rescuers Down Under (1990).

In a bid to drive sales of the system and increase the company's capital, Jobs suggested releasing the product to the mainstream market. Pixar employee John Lasseter, who had long been working on not-for-profit short demonstration animations, such as Luxo Jr. (1986) to show off the device's capabilities, premiered his creations to great fanfare at SIGGRAPH, the computer graphics industry's largest convention.

However, the Image Computer had inadequate sales which threatened to end the company as financial losses grew. Jobs increased investment in exchange for an increased stake, reducing the proportion of management and employee ownership until eventually, his total investment of $50 million gave him control of the entire company. In 1989, Lasseter's growing animation department which was originally composed of just four people (Lasseter, Bill Reeves, Eben Ostby, and Sam Leffler), was turned into a division that produced computer-animated commercials for outside companies. In April 1990, Pixar sold its hardware division, including all proprietary hardware technology and imaging software, to Vicom Systems, and transferred 18 of Pixar's approximately 100 employees. In the same year Pixar moved from San Rafael to Richmond, California. Pixar released some of its software tools on the open market for Macintosh and Windows systems. RenderMan is one of the leading 3D packages of the early 1990s, and Typestry is a special-purpose 3D text renderer that competed with RayDream.

During this period of time, Pixar continued its successful relationship with Walt Disney Feature Animation, a studio whose corporate parent would ultimately become its most important partner. As 1991 began, however the layoff of 30 employees in the company's computer hardware department—including the company's president, Chuck Kolstad, reduced the total number of employees to just 42, approximately its original number. Pixar made a historic $26 million deal with Disney to produce three computer-animated feature films, the first of which was Toy Story, the product of the technological limitations that challenged CGI. By then the software programmers, who were doing RenderMan and IceMan, and Lasseter's animation department, which made television commercials (and four Luxo Jr. shorts for Sesame Street the same year), were all that remained of Pixar.

Even with income from these projects, the company continued to lose money and Steve Jobs, as chairman of the board and now the full owner, often considered selling it. Even as late as 1994, Jobs contemplated selling Pixar to other companies such as Hallmark Cards, Microsoft co-founder Paul Allen, and Oracle CEO and co-founder Larry Ellison. Only after learning from New York critics that Toy Story would probably be a hit—and confirming that Disney would distribute it for the 1995 Christmas season—did he decide to give Pixar another chance. Also for the first time, he took an active leadership role in the company and made himself CEO. Toy Story grossed more than $373 million worldwide and, when Pixar held its initial public offering on November 29, 1995, it exceeded Netscape's as the biggest IPO of the year. In its first half-hour of trading, Pixar stock shot from $22 to $45, delaying trading because of unmatched buy orders.

The company continued to make the television commercials during the production of Toy Story, came to an end on July 9, 1996, when Pixar announced they would shut down its televion-commercial unit, which counted 18 employees, to focus on longer projects and interactive entertainment.

During the 1990s and 2000s, Pixar gradually developed the "Pixar Braintrust", the studio's primary creative development process, in which all of its directors, writers, and lead storyboard artists regularly examine each other's projects and give very candid "notes", the industry term for constructive criticism. The Braintrust operates under a philosophy of a "filmmaker-driven studio", in which creatives help each other move their films forward through a process somewhat like peer review, as opposed to the traditional Hollywood approach of an "executive-driven studio" in which directors are micromanaged through "mandatory notes" from development executives outranking the producers. According to Catmull, it evolved out of the working relationship between Lasseter, Stanton, Docter, Unkrich, and Joe Ranft on Toy Story.

As a result of the success of Toy Story, Pixar built a new studio at the Emeryville campus which was designed by PWP Landscape Architecture and opened in November 2000.

Collaboration with Disney (1999–2006) 
Pixar and Disney had disagreements over the production of Toy Story 2. Originally intended as a direct-to-video release (and thus not part of Pixar's three-picture deal), the film was eventually upgraded to a theatrical release during production. Pixar demanded that the film then be counted toward the three-picture agreement, but Disney refused. Though profitable for both, Pixar later complained that the arrangement was not equitable. Pixar was responsible for creation and production, while Disney handled marketing and distribution. Profits and production costs were split equally, but Disney exclusively owned all story, character, and sequel rights and also collected a 10- to 15-percent distribution fee. The lack of these rights was perhaps the most onerous aspect for Pixar and precipitated a contentious relationship.

The two companies attempted to reach a new agreement for ten months and failed on January 26, 2001, July 26, 2002, April 22, 2003, January 16, 2004, July 22, 2004, and January 14, 2005. The new deal would be only for distribution, as Pixar intended to control production and own the resulting story, character, and sequel rights while Disney would own the right of first refusal to distribute any sequels. Pixar also wanted to finance its own films and collect 100 percent profit, paying Disney only the 10- to 15-percent distribution fee. More importantly, as part of any distribution agreement with Disney, Pixar demanded control over films already in production under the old agreement, including The Incredibles (2004) and Cars (2006). Disney considered these conditions unacceptable, but Pixar would not concede.

Disagreements between Steve Jobs and Disney chairman and CEO Michael Eisner made the negotiations more difficult than they otherwise might have been. They broke down completely in mid-2004, with Disney forming Circle Seven Animation and Jobs declaring that Pixar was actively seeking partners other than Disney. Even with this announcement and several talks with Warner Bros., Sony Pictures, and 20th Century Fox, Pixar did not enter negotiations with other distributors, although a Warner Bros. spokesperson told CNN, "We would love to be in business with Pixar. They are a great company." After a lengthy hiatus, negotiations between the two companies resumed following the departure of Eisner from Disney in September 2005. In preparation for potential fallout between Pixar and Disney, Jobs announced in late 2004 that Pixar would no longer release movies at the Disney-dictated November time frame, but during the more lucrative early summer months. This would also allow Pixar to release DVDs for its major releases during the Christmas shopping season. An added benefit of delaying Cars from November 4, 2005, to June 9, 2006, was to extend the time frame remaining on the Pixar-Disney contract, to see how things would play out between the two companies.

Pending the Disney acquisition of Pixar, the two companies created a distribution deal for the intended 2007 release of Ratatouille, to ensure that if the acquisition failed, this one film would be released through Disney's distribution channels. In contrast to the earlier Pixar deal, Ratatouille was meant to remain a Pixar property and Disney would have received only a distribution fee. The completion of Disney's Pixar acquisition, however, nullified this distribution arrangement.

Walt Disney Studios subsidiary (2006–present) 
On January 24, 2006, Disney ultimately agreed to buy Pixar for approximately $7.4 billion in an all-stock deal. Following Pixar shareholder approval, the acquisition was completed on May 5, 2006. The transaction catapulted Jobs, who owned 49.65% of total share interest in Pixar, to Disney's largest individual shareholder with 7%, valued at $3.9 billion, and a new seat on its board of directors. Jobs' new Disney holdings exceeded holdings belonging to ex-CEO Michael Eisner, the previous top shareholder, who still held 1.7%; and Disney Director Emeritus Roy E. Disney, who held almost 1% of the corporation's shares. Pixar shareholders received 2.3 shares of Disney common stock for each share of Pixar common stock redeemed.

As part of the deal, John Lasseter, by then Executive Vice President, became Chief Creative Officer (reporting directly to president and CEO Robert Iger and consulting with Disney Director Roy E. Disney) of both Pixar and Walt Disney Animation Studios (including its division DisneyToon Studios), as well as the Principal Creative Adviser at Walt Disney Imagineering, which designs and builds the company's theme parks. Catmull retained his position as President of Pixar, while also becoming President of Walt Disney Animation Studios, reporting to Iger and Dick Cook, chairman of the Walt Disney Studios. Jobs's position as Pixar's chairman and chief executive officer was abolished, and instead, he took a place on the Disney board of directors.

After the deal closed in May 2006, Lasseter revealed that Iger had realized Disney needed to buy Pixar while watching a parade at the opening of Hong Kong Disneyland in September 2005. Iger noticed that of all the Disney characters in the parade, not one was a character that Disney had created within the last ten years since all the newer ones had been created by Pixar. Upon returning to Burbank, Iger commissioned a financial analysis that confirmed that Disney had actually lost money on animation for the past decade, then presented that information to the board of directors at his first board meeting after being promoted from COO to CEO, and the board, in turn, authorized him to explore the possibility of a deal with Pixar. Lasseter and Catmull were wary when the topic of Disney buying Pixar first came up, but Jobs asked them to give Iger a chance (based on his own experience negotiating with Iger in summer 2005 for the rights to ABC shows for the fifth-generation iPod Classic), and in turn, Iger convinced them of the sincerity of his epiphany that Disney really needed to re-focus on animation.

Lasseter and Catmull's oversight of both the Disney Feature Animation and Pixar studios did not mean that the two studios were merging, however. In fact, additional conditions were laid out as part of the deal to ensure that Pixar remained a separate entity, a concern that analysts had expressed about the Disney deal. Some of those conditions were that Pixar HR policies would remain intact, including the lack of employment contracts. Also, the Pixar name was guaranteed to continue, and the studio would remain in its current Emeryville, California, location with the "Pixar" sign. Finally, branding of films made post-merger would be "Disney•Pixar" (beginning with Cars).

Jim Morris, producer of WALL-E (2008), became general manager of Pixar. In this new position, Morris took charge of the day-to-day running of the studio facilities and products.

After a few years, Lasseter and Catmull were able to successfully transfer the basic principles of the Pixar Braintrust to Disney Animation, although meetings of the Disney Story Trust are reportedly "more polite" than those of the Pixar Braintrust. Catmull later explained that after the merger, to maintain the studios' separate identities and cultures (notwithstanding the fact of common ownership and common senior management), he and Lasseter "drew a hard line" that each studio was solely responsible for its own projects and would not be allowed to borrow personnel from or lend tasks out to the other. The rule ensures that each studio maintains "local ownership" of projects and can be proud of its own work. Thus for example, when Pixar had issues with Ratatouille and Disney Animation had issues with Bolt (2008), "nobody bailed them out" and each studio was required "to solve the problem on its own" even when they knew there were personnel at the other studio who theoretically could have helped.

Expansion (2010–2018) 
On April 20, 2010, Pixar opened Pixar Canada in the downtown area of Vancouver, British Columbia, Canada. The roughly 2,000 square meters studio produced seven short films based on Toy Story and Cars characters. In October 2013, the studio was closed down to refocus Pixar's efforts at its main headquarters.

In November 2014, Morris was promoted to president of Pixar, while his counterpart at Disney Animation, general manager Andrew Millstein, was also promoted to president of that studio. Both continued to report to Catmull, who retained the title of president of both Disney Animation and Pixar.

On November 21, 2017, Lasseter announced that he was taking a six-month leave of absence after acknowledging what he called "missteps" in his behavior with employees in a memo to staff. According to The Hollywood Reporter and The Washington Post, Lasseter had a history of alleged sexual misconduct towards employees. On June 8, 2018, it was announced that Lasseter would leave Disney Animation and Pixar at the end of the year, but would take on a consulting role until then. Pete Docter was announced as Lasseter's replacement as chief creative officer of Pixar on June 19, 2018.

Studio resurgence (2018–present) 
On October 23, 2018, it was announced that Catmull would be retiring. He stayed in an adviser role until July 2019. On January 18, 2019, it was announced that Lee Unkrich would be leaving Pixar after 25 years.

Campus

When Steve Jobs, chief executive officer of Apple Inc. and Pixar, and John Lasseter, then-executive vice president of Pixar, decided to move their studios from a leased space in Point Richmond, California, to larger quarters of their own, they chose a 20-acre site in Emeryville, California, formerly occupied by Del Monte Foods, Inc. The first of several buildings, the high-tech structure designed by Bohlin Cywinski Jackson has special foundations and electricity generators to ensure continued film production, even through major earthquakes. The character of the building is intended to abstractly recall Emeryville's industrial past. The two-story steel-and-masonry building is a collaborative space with many pathways.

The digital revolution in filmmaking was driven by applied mathematics, including computational physics and geometry. In 2008, this led Pixar senior scientist Tony DeRose to offer to host the second Julia Robinson Mathematics Festival at the Emeryville campus.

Filmography

Traditions
Some of Pixar's first animators were former cel animators including John Lasseter, and others came from computer animation or were fresh college graduates. A large number of animators that make up its animation department had been hired around the releases of A Bug's Life (1998), Monsters, Inc. (2001), and Finding Nemo (2003). The success of Toy Story (1995) made Pixar the first major computer-animation studio to successfully produce theatrical feature films. Traditional hand-drawn animation was still the dominant medium for feature animated films.

With the scarcity of Los Angeles-based animators willing to move their families so far north to give up traditional animation and try computer animation, Pixar's new hires at this time either came directly from college or had worked outside feature animation. For those who had traditional animation skills, the Pixar animation software Marionette was designed so that traditional animators would require a minimum amount of training before becoming productive.

In an interview with PBS talk show host Tavis Smiley, Lasseter said that Pixar's films follow the same theme of self-improvement as the company itself has: with the help of friends or family, a character ventures out into the real world and learns to appreciate his friends and family. At the core, Lasseter said, "it's gotta be about the growth of the main character and how he changes."

Actor John Ratzenberger, who had previously starred in the television series Cheers, has voiced a character in every Pixar feature film from Toy Story through Onward (2020). At this point, he does not have a role in future Pixar films; however, a non-speaking background character in Soul bears his likeness. Pixar paid tribute to Ratzenberger in the end credits of Cars (2006) by parodying scenes from three of its earlier films (Toy Story, Monsters, Inc., and A Bug's Life), replacing all of the characters with motor vehicle versions of them and giving each film an automotive-based title. After the third scene, Mack (his character in Cars) realizes that the same actor has been voicing characters in every film.

Due to the traditions that have occurred within the films and shorts such as anthropomorphic creatures and objects, and easter egg crossovers between films and shorts that have been spotted by Pixar fans, a blog post titled The Pixar Theory was published in 2013 by Jon Negroni, and popularized by the YouTube channel Super Carlin Brothers, proposing that all of the characters within the Pixar universe were related, surrounding Boo from Monsters Inc. and the Witch from Brave (2012).

Additionally, Pixar is known for their films having expensive budgets, ranging from $150–200 million. Some of their films include Ratatouille (2007), Toy Story 3 (2010), Toy Story 4 (2019), Incredibles 2 (2018), Soul (2020), The Good Dinosaur (2015), Onward (2020), Turning Red (2022), and Lightyear (2022).

Sequels and prequels

As of September 2022, six Pixar films have received or will receive sequels or prequels. These films are Toy Story, Cars, Monsters, Inc., Finding Nemo, The Incredibles, and Inside Out.

Toy Story 2 was originally commissioned by Disney as a 60-minute direct-to-video film. Expressing doubts about the strength of the material, John Lasseter convinced the Pixar team to start from scratch and make the sequel their third full-length feature film.

Following the release of Toy Story 2 in 1999, Pixar and Disney had a gentlemen's agreement that Disney would not make any sequels without Pixar's involvement though retaining a right to do so. After the two companies were unable to agree on a new deal, Disney announced in 2004 they would plan to move forward on sequels with or without Pixar and put Toy Story 3 into pre-production at Disney's then-new CGI division Circle Seven Animation. However, when Lasseter was placed in charge of all Disney and Pixar animation following Disney's acquisition of Pixar in 2006, he put all sequels on hold and Toy Story 3 was canceled. In May 2006, it was announced that Toy Story 3 was back in pre-production with a new plot and under Pixar's control. The film was released on June 18, 2010, as Pixar's eleventh feature film.

Shortly after announcing the resurrection of Toy Story 3, Lasseter fueled speculation on further sequels by saying, "If we have a great story, we'll do a sequel." Cars 2, Pixar's first non-Toy Story sequel, was officially announced in April 2008 and released on June 24, 2011, as their twelfth. Monsters University, a prequel to Monsters, Inc. (2001), was announced in April 2010 and initially set for release in November 2012; the release date was pushed to June 21, 2013, due to Pixar's past success with summer releases, according to a Disney executive.

In June 2011, Tom Hanks, who voiced Woody in the Toy Story series, implied that Toy Story 4 was "in the works", although it had not yet been confirmed by the studio. In April 2013, Finding Dory, a sequel to Finding Nemo, was announced for a June 17, 2016 release. In March 2014, Incredibles 2 and Cars 3 were announced as films in development. In November 2014, Toy Story 4 was confirmed to be in development with Lasseter serving as director. However, in July 2017, Lasseter announced that he had stepped down, leaving Josh Cooley as sole director. Released in June 2019, Toy Story 4 ranks among the 40 top-grossing films in American cinema.

After Toy Story 4, Pixar chief Pete Docter said that the studio would take a break from sequels and focus on original projects. However, in a later interview, Docter said the studio would have to return to making sequels at some point  as they are more "financially secure and help keep the studio running." On September 9, 2022, during the D23 Expo, Docter and Amy Poehler (voice of Joy) confirmed that Inside Out 2 is in the works, scheduled to release on June 14, 2024.

Adaptation to television
Toy Story is the first Pixar film to be adapted for television as Buzz Lightyear of Star Command film and TV series on the UPN television network, now The CW. Cars became the second with the help of Cars Toons, a series of 3-to-5-minute short films running between regular Disney Channel show intervals and featuring Mater from Cars. Between 2013 and 2014, Pixar released its first two television specials, Toy Story of Terror! and Toy Story That Time Forgot. Monsters at Work, a television series spin-off of Monsters, Inc., premiered in July 2021 on Disney+.

On December 10, 2020, it was announced that three series would be released on Disney+. The first is Dug Days (featuring Dug from Up) where Dug explores suburbia. Dug Days premiered on September 1, 2021. Next a Cars show, titled Cars on the Road, was announced to arrive on Disney+ on September 8, 2022 following Mater and Lightning McQueen as they go on a road trip. Lastly, an original show entitled Win or Lose would be released on Disney+ in Fall 2023. The series will follow a middle school softball team the week leading up to the big championship game where each episode will be from a different perspective.

2D animation and live-action
The Pixar filmography to date has been computer-animated features, but so far, WALL-E (2008) has been the only Pixar film not to be completely animated as it featured a small amount of live-action footage including Hello, Dolly! while Day & Night (2010), Kitbull (2019), Burrow (2020), and Twenty Something (2021) are the only four shorts to feature 2D animation. 1906, the live-action film by Brad Bird based on a screenplay and novel by James Dalessandro about the 1906 earthquake, was in development but has since been abandoned by Bird and Pixar. Bird has stated that he was "interested in moving into the live-action realm with some projects" while "staying at Pixar [because] it's a very comfortable environment for me to work in". In June 2018, Bird mentioned the possibility of adapting the novel as a TV series, and the earthquake sequence as a live-action feature film.

The Toy Story Toons short Hawaiian Vacation (2011) also includes the fish and shark as live-action.

Jim Morris, president of Pixar, produced Disney's John Carter (2012) which Andrew Stanton co-wrote and directed.

Pixar's creative heads were consulted to fine tune the script for the 2011 live-action film The Muppets. Similarly, Pixar assisted in the story development of Disney's The Jungle Book (2016) as well as providing suggestions for the film's end credits sequence. Both Pixar and Mark Andrews were given a "Special Thanks" credit in the film's credits. Additionally, many Pixar animators, both former and current, were recruited for a traditional hand-drawn animated sequence for the 2018 film Mary Poppins Returns.

Pixar representatives have also assisted in the English localization of several Studio Ghibli films, mainly those from Hayao Miyazaki.

In 2019, Pixar developed a live-action hidden camera reality show, titled Pixar in Real Life, for Disney+.

Upcoming films

Co-op Program
The Pixar Co-op Program, a part of the Pixar University professional development program, allows their animators to use Pixar resources to produce independent films. The first 3D project accepted to the program was Borrowed Time (2016); all previously accepted films were live-action.

Franchises
This does not include the Cars spinoffs produced by DisneyToon Studios.

Exhibitions
Since December 2005, Pixar has held a variety of exhibitions celebrating the art and artists of the organization and its contribution to the world of animation.

Pixar: 20 Years of Animation
Upon its 20th anniversary, in 2006, Pixar celebrated with the release of its seventh feature film Cars, and held two exhibitions from April to June 2006 at Science Centre Singapore in Jurong East, Singapore and the London Science Museum in London. It was their first time holding an exhibition in Singapore.

The exhibition highlights consist of work-in-progress sketches from various Pixar productions, clay sculptures of their characters and an autostereoscopic short showcasing a 3D version of the exhibition pieces which is projected through four projectors. Another highlight is the Zoetrope, where visitors of the exhibition are shown figurines of Toy Story characters "animated" in real-life through the zoetrope.

Pixar: 25 Years of Animation
Pixar celebrated its 25th anniversary in 2011 with the release of its twelfth feature film Cars 2, and held an exhibition at the Oakland Museum of California from July 2010 until January 2011. The exhibition tour debuted in Hong Kong and was held at the Hong Kong Heritage Museum in Sha Tin from March 27 to July 11, 2011. In 2013, the exhibition was held in the EXPO in Amsterdam, The Netherlands. For 6 months from July 6, 2012, until January 6, 2013, the city of Bonn (Germany) hosted the public showing,

On November 16, 2013, the exhibition moved to the Art Ludique museum in Paris, France with a scheduled run until March 2, 2014. The exhibition moved to three Spanish cities later in 2014 and 2015: Madrid (held in CaixaForum from March 21 until June 22), Barcelona (held also in Caixaforum from February until May) and Zaragoza.

Pixar: 25 Years of Animation includes all of the artwork from Pixar: 20 Years of Animation, plus art from Ratatouille, WALL-E, Up and Toy Story 3.

The Science Behind Pixar
The Science Behind Pixar is a travelling exhibition that first opened on June 28, 2015, at the Museum of Science in Boston, Massachusetts. It was developed by the Museum of Science in collaboration with Pixar. The exhibit features forty interactive elements that explain the production pipeline at Pixar. They are divided into eight sections, each demonstrating a step in the filmmaking process: Modeling, Rigging, Surfaces, Sets & Cameras, Animation, Simulation, Lighting, and Rendering. Before visitors enter the exhibit, they watch a short video at an introductory theater showing Mr. Ray from Finding Nemo and Roz from Monsters, Inc..

The exhibition closed on January 10, 2016, and was moved to the Franklin Institute in Philadelphia, Pennsylvania where it ran from March 12 to September 5. Afterwards, it moved to the California Science Center in Los Angeles, California and was open from October 15, 2016, to April 9, 2017. It made another stop at the Science Museum of Minnesota in St. Paul, Minnesota from May 27 through September 4, 2017.

The exhibition opened in Edmonton, Alberta on July 1, 2017, at the TELUS World of Science – Edmonton (TWOSE).

Pixar: The Design of Story
Pixar: The Design of Story was an exhibition held at the Cooper Hewitt, Smithsonian Design Museum in New York City from October 8, 2015, to September 11, 2016. The museum also hosted a presentation and conversation with John Lasseter on November 12, 2015, entitled "Design By Hand: Pixar's John Lasseter".

Pixar: 30 Years of Animation
Pixar celebrated its 30th anniversary in 2016 with the release of its seventeenth feature film Finding Dory, and put together another milestone exhibition. The exhibition first opened at the Museum of Contemporary Art in Tokyo, Japan from March 5, 2016, to May 29, 2016. It subsequently moved to the Nagasaki Prefectural Art Museum National Museum of History, Dongdaemun Design Plaza where it ended on March 5, 2018, at the Hong Kong Heritage Museum.

Legacy
Pixar has a strong legacy with its reach on many different generations. Its emotional depth combined with its playfulness integrated in a cutting-edge technology has left it with a lasting legacy among children and adult viewers. With Pixar's success, many have considered it an integral part of what it means to be a child, which may contribute to its popularity in an often separate adult audience. From the 1990s to the present, Pixar movies have become a central force in animation. Discover Magazine wrote:
The message hidden inside Pixar’s magnificent films is this: humanity does not have a monopoly on personhood. In whatever form non- or super-human intelligence takes, it will need brave souls on both sides to defend what is right. If we can live up to this burden, humanity and the world we live in will be better for it.

See also

The Walt Disney Company
Disney's Nine Old Men
12 basic principles of animation
Disney Animation: The Illusion of Life
Modern animation in the United States: Disney
Animation studios owned by The Walt Disney Company
 Walt Disney Animation Studios
Disneytoon Studios
Blue Sky Studios
20th Century Animation
List of animation studios
List of Disney theatrical animated feature films

References

External links 

 
 
 
 List of the 40 founding employees of Pixar

 
Computer animation studios
1986 establishments in California
2006 mergers and acquisitions
American animation studios
American companies established in 1986
Cinema of the San Francisco Bay Area
Companies based in Emeryville, California
Disney acquisitions
Disney production studios
Entertainment companies based in California
Film production companies of the United States
Film studios
Mass media companies established in 1986
Pixar
Walt Disney Studios (division)